Françoise Nourry (born 1 September 1948) is a French gymnast. She competed in six events at the 1968 Summer Olympics.

References

External links
 

1948 births
Living people
French female artistic gymnasts
Olympic gymnasts of France
Gymnasts at the 1968 Summer Olympics
People from Bègles
Sportspeople from Gironde